IRAS 16293–2422 is a binary system consisting of at least two forming protostars A and B, separated by a distance of 700 astronomical units (au), both having masses similar to that of the Sun.  It is located in the Rho Ophiuchi star-forming region, at a distance of 140 parsecs (pc). Astronomers using the ALMA array found glycolaldehyde — a simple form of sugar — in the gas surrounding the star. This discovery was the first time sugar has been found in space around a solar-type star on scales corresponding to the distance between Sun and Uranus - i.e., the scales where a planet-forming disk is expected to arise. The discovery shows that the building blocks of life may in the right place, at the right time, to be included in planets forming around the star.

Chloromethane, also known as methyl chloride, was detected for the first time in the interstellar medium in IRAS 16293–2422. Chloromethane is an important biomarker but its discovery in a protostellar system showed that it can be formed through abiotic processes in space.

The accretion disk was found to have parts rotating in opposite directions, the first time such a discovery has been made, and means that when planets form, the inner planets may orbit the opposite direction to the outer planets.

References

Ophiuchus (constellation)
Binary stars
Protostars
16293-2422
Articles containing video clips